Jago FM is a Bangladeshi FM radio station, the headquarter of radio is situated in Dhaka. It has started broadcasting on 27 October 2015.

References

2015 establishments in Bangladesh
Organisations based in Dhaka
Radio stations in Bangladesh
Mass media in Dhaka